Judge Goodwin may refer to:

Alfred Goodwin (born 1923), judge of the United States Court of Appeals for the Ninth Circuit
Charles Barnes Goodwin (born 1970), judge of the United States District Court for the Western District of Oklahoma
Charles Wycliffe Goodwin (1817–1878), assistant judge and acting chief judge of the British Supreme Court for China and Japan
Joseph Robert Goodwin (born 1942), judge of the United States District Court for the Southern District of West Virginia
William Nelson Goodwin (1909–1975), judge of the United States District Courts for the Eastern and Western Districts of Washington

See also
Justice Goodwin (disambiguation)